David Hatcher Childress (born June 1, 1957) is a French-born American author, and the owner of Adventures Unlimited Press, a publishing house established in 1984 specializing in books on unusual topics such as ancient mysteries, unexplained phenomena, alternative history, and historical revisionism. His own works primarily concentrate on pseudoarchaeological and pseudoscientific topics such as "UFOs, secret societies, suppressed technology, cryptozoology [and] conspiracy theory." Childress, having no degree, refers to himself as a "rogue archaeologist".

Biography
Born in France to American parents, and raised in Colorado and Montana, United States, Childress went to University of Montana–Missoula to study archaeology, but left college in 1976 at 19 to begin travelling in pursuit of his archaeological interests. After several years in Asia and then Africa, Childress moved in 1983 to Stelle, Illinois, a community founded by New Age writer Richard Kieninger; Childress had been given one of Kieninger's books while touring Africa. Childress chronicled his explorations in the 1970s, 1980s, and 1990s in his Lost Cities and Ancient Mysteries series of books.

Childress's first book, A Hitchhikers Guide to Africa and Arabia, was published in 1983 by Chicago Review Press. In 1984, Childress moved to Kempton, Illinois, and established a publishing company named Adventures Unlimited Press, which is a sole proprietorship. His company published his own works and then those of other authors, presenting fringe-scientific theories regarding ancient civilizations, cryptozoology, and little-known technologies. In 1992, Childress founded the World Explorers Club, which occasionally runs tours to places he writes about, and publishes a magazine called World Explorer.

Childress has  appeared on NBC (The Mysterious Origins of Man), Fox Network (Sightings and Encounters), Discovery Channel, A&E, and History (e.g. Ancient Aliens), to comment on subjects such as the Bermuda Triangle, Atlantis, and UFOs. Since first entering the industry in 1984, Childress has been involved in two lawsuits regarding publishing; one, concerning the Kennedy assassination, failed after expiry of a statute of limitations and the other, involving an unpublished master's thesis about UFOs written in 1950, was settled out of court. Childress writes humorously about these suits in his 2000 autobiography A Hitchhiker's Guide to Armageddon. Childress has been interviewed on several radio programs.

Reception
Patrick D. Nunn, a professor of geography at the University of the Sunshine Coast has noted that Childress is a proponent of pseudoscientific claims such as the lost continent Mu and megaliths on the Pacific islands built by levitation. Nunn has written that "the disappearance of Mu is very convenient because it means that theorists like Childress can say what they like and appear convincing to people who are comparatively uninformed, as many naturally are, of the huge body of scientific information on Pacific geology and cultures."

Historical archaeologist Charles E. Orser (editor of International Journal of Historical Archaeology) has criticized Childress's writings:

Publications
Childress's company has published nearly 200 books (many translated into foreign languages) over the course of two dozen years. Childress himself has authored and co-authored over a dozen books, from his first in 1983 to his most recent in 2013. His influences include Erich von Däniken, Thor Heyerdahl, and Charles Berlitz.

Author or co-author

 A Hitchhikers Guide to Africa and Arabia, 1984, 
 Lost Cities and Ancient Mysteries of Africa and Arabia, 1984, 
 Lost Cities of China, Central Asia and India, 1984, 
 Lost Cities and Ancient Mysteries of South America, 
 Lost Cities of Ancient Lemuria and the Pacific, 
 Lost Cities of North and Central America, 
 Lost Cities of Atlantis, Ancient Europe and the Mediterranean, 
 Extraterrestrial Archeology 
 Vimana Aircraft of Ancient India and Atlantis, 
 Man-Made UFOs 1944-1994 (with Renato Vesco) 
 The Time Travel Handbook 
 Pirates and the Lost Templar Fleet 
 Technology of the Gods, The Incredible Science of the Ancients, 
 Lost Continents and the Hollow Earth 
 A Hitchhikers Guide to Armageddon 
 Mystery of the Olmecs 
 Inside the Gemstone File (with Kenn Thomas) 
 Lost Cities and Ancient Mysteries of the American Southwest 
 Yetis, Sasquatch and Hairy Giants 
 Ancient Micronesia and the Lost City of Nan Modal  (1998)
 The Enigma of Cranial Deformation: Elongated Skulls of the Ancients (with Brien Foerster) (2012)
 Vimana : Flying Machines of the Ancients  (2013)
 The Lost World of Cham: The TransPacific Voyages of the Champa" (2017)
 Haunebu- the Secret Files: The Greatest Ufo Secret of All Time  (2021)

Editor

 The Anti-Gravity Handbook 3rd ed (edited) 
 Anti-Gravity and the World Grid (edited) 
 Anti-Gravity and the Unified Field (edited) 
 The Free-Energy Device Handbook (edited) 
 The Tesla Papers 

Contributor

 Discovering the Mysteries of Ancient America: Lost History And Legends, Unearthed And Explored 
 Unearthing Ancient America: The Lost Sagas of Conquerors, Castaways, and Scoundrels  
 The Fantastic Inventions of Nikola Tesla''

Notes

External links
David Hatcher Childress, official website   
Adventures Unlimited Press, official website  
World Explorers Club, official website  
 

1957 births
Living people
Cryptozoologists
Pseudohistorians
French emigrants to the United States
Pseudoarchaeologists
Atlantis proponents
Ancient astronauts proponents
People from Ford County, Illinois
American male writers
Free energy conspiracy theorists
American conspiracy theorists
Pseudoscience